Shou Wan-por (born July 17, 1960), known professionally as Robin Shou, is a Hong Kong-American actor, martial artist and stuntman. He is known for roles such as Liu Kang in the Mortal Kombat film series (1995 and 1997), Gobei in Beverly Hills Ninja (1997), Gen in Street Fighter: The Legend of Chun-Li (2009), and 14K in the Death Race films (2008-2013). Shou was also a Hong Kong action star in the late 1980s and early 1990s and has appeared in about 40 movies during his Hong Kong career before he entered Hollywood in 1994.

Biography
Shou's first real dramatic role was in Forbidden Nights in 1990, with Melissa Gilbert. Though only a TV film, this was his American debut. However, Shou went back to Hong Kong and continued making movies there. In 1994, Shou returned to Los Angeles whereupon he appeared as Liu Kang, a Shaolin monk seeking revenge for the death of his younger brother, in Mortal Kombat.

Shou also appeared in a minor role in another fighting video game adaptation, DOA: Dead or Alive, based on Tecmo's video game series of the same name, produced by Mortal Kombat director Paul W. S. Anderson and producer Jeremy Bolt. He played 14K in the Death Race series, and also appeared as Gen in 2009's Street Fighter: The Legend of Chun-Li. Shou trained Milla Jovovich for her role in Resident Evil.

He is fluent in English in addition to his native Chinese.

Filmography

Film

Television

Video games

References

External links

 
 Robin Shou Hong Kong Cinema interview with Robin Shou
 Robin Shou Interview

1960 births
Living people
Male actors from Los Angeles
Male actors from Palm Springs, California
American sanshou practitioners
Hong Kong martial artists
Hong Kong male television actors
Hong Kong male film actors
20th-century Hong Kong male actors
21st-century Hong Kong male actors
Palm Springs High School people
Hong Kong emigrants to the United States